Sir John Norris Nicholson, 2nd Baronet, KBE, CIE, MA, JP (19 February 1911 – 30 August 1993) was Lord Lieutenant of the Isle of Wight from 1980 to 1985.

He was the only child of Captain George Crosfield Norris Nicholson, RFC, and Evelyn Izme née Murray, the daughter of Montolieu Oliphant-Murray, 1st Viscount Elibank. He was educated at Winchester College and Trinity College, Cambridge.  In 1938 he married Vittoria Vivien née Trewhella: they had two sons and two daughters. During World War II he served with the Cheshire Regiment. From 1942 to 1946 he was seconded to the Ministry of War Transport.

Notes

1911 births
1993 deaths
British Army personnel of World War II
Cheshire Regiment officers
People educated at Winchester College
Alumni of Trinity College, Cambridge
Lord Lieutenants of the Isle of Wight
Knights Commander of the Order of the British Empire
Companions of the Order of the Indian Empire
Baronets in the Baronetage of the United Kingdom